Cameron John Adams (born April 6, 2000) is an American actor. He made his acting debut in the film Dan in Real Life (2007) and became best known for his title role in the film The Odd Life of Timothy Green (2012).

Early life
Adams was born Cameron John Adams in Elmhurst, Illinois, on April 6, 2000, to Donna and Matt Adams. He was raised in Providence, Rhode Island.

Career
Adams played the title character in the 2012 feature film The Odd Life of Timothy Green, which earned him the Young Artist Award for Best Leading Young Actor Age Ten and Under. He previously had a role in the 2007 feature film Dan in Real Life.

Filmography

Film

Television

Accolades

References

External links
 

2000 births
Living people
American male film actors
American male television actors
American male child actors
Male actors from Illinois
Male actors from Rhode Island
21st-century American male actors